In German linguistics, the Boppard Line is an isogloss separating the dialects to the north, which have a /v/ in words  such as Korv (or Korf), "basket", and leven, "to live", from the dialects to the south (including standard German), which have a /b/: Korb, leben.  The line runs from east to west and crosses the river Rhine at the town of Boppard.

See also
 High German consonant shift

German language
Isoglosses